Nílton Pinheiro da Silva (born 5 November 1954), known as Nílton Batata, is a Brazilian footballer.

Club career
Nílton Batata played for Athletico Paranaense and Santos in Brazil, then he joined Club América in Mexico. Later on, he moved to the USA to play indoor soccer for Los Angeles Lazers. Then he played for Chicago Sting, before returning to indoor soccer by joining Chicago Power.

International career
He played in four matches for the Brazil in 1979. He was also part of Brazil's squad for the 1979 Copa América tournament.

Later career
Nílton has owned a football academy since 1983. He also coached Sockers FC Chicago U13–U14.

In 2012, Nílton joined the Spanish-language sports television network ESPN Deportes, where he served as a commentator alongside reporter Richard Méndez for matches in Brazil.

Notes

References

External links
 

1954 births
Living people
Brazilian footballers
Brazil international footballers
Sportspeople from Londrina
Association football forwards
Club Athletico Paranaense players
Santos FC players
Campeonato Brasileiro Série A players
Club América footballers
Liga MX players
Los Angeles Lazers players
Chicago Sting players
Chicago Power players
Major Indoor Soccer League (1978–1992) players
North American Soccer League (1968–1984) players
Expatriate footballers in Mexico
Brazilian expatriate sportspeople in Mexico
Expatriate soccer players in the United States
Brazilian expatriate sportspeople in the United States
Brazilian expatriate footballers